The 1963–64 Serie A season was the 30th season of the Serie A, the top level of ice hockey in Italy. Six teams participated in the league, and SG Cortina won the championship.

First round

Final round

External links
 Season on hockeytime.net

1963–64 in Italian ice hockey
Serie A (ice hockey) seasons
Serie A